The RP-125 class of Harbour tugboats consists of 10 units (the fourth batch) built for the Marina Militare, named as Rimorchiatore Portuale

Ships

References

External links
 Ships Marina Militare website

Auxiliary ships of the Italian Navy
Ships built in Italy
Auxiliary tugboat classes